The 1934 Illinois Fighting Illini football team was an American football team that represented the University of Illinois during the 1934 college football season.  In their 22nd season under head coach Robert Zuppke, the Illini compiled a 7–1 record and finished in third place in the Big Ten Conference.  The lone setback was a 7–3 loss at Wisconsin. Halfback Les Lindberg was selected as the team's most valuable player.

Schedule

Players
 Charles W. Bennis - guard (2nd-team All-Big Ten pick by UP)
 Jack Beynon - quarterback (1st-team All-Big Ten pick by AP and UP)
 Chuck Galbreath - tackle (1st-team All-Big Ten pick by UP; 3rd-team All-American pick by AP)
 Lester Lindberg - halfback

References

Illinois
Illinois Fighting Illini football seasons
Illinois Fighting Illini football